The Universities of Oxford and Cambridge Act 1859 (22 & 23 Vict c 19) is an Act of the Parliament of the United Kingdom. It repealed so much of the Oxford and Cambridge Act 1571, and of all charters, etc., as imposed on the mayor, aldermen, and citizens of the City of Oxford the obligation of taking any oath for the conservation of the liberties and privileges of the University of Oxford.

References
Halsbury's Statutes,

External links
The Universities of Oxford and Cambridge Act 1859, as amended, from the National Archives.
The Universities of Oxford and Cambridge Act 1859, as originally enacted, from the National Archives.

United Kingdom Acts of Parliament 1859
History of the University of Oxford
History of the University of Cambridge
19th century in Cambridgeshire
19th century in Oxfordshire
University-related legislation